C. Bertram Payne (July 17, 1909 – May 19, 1998) was an American curler.

The Bert Payne Junior Bonspiel was held in Duluth Curling Club.

Payne was a country club manager.

Teams

References

External links
 

1909 births
1998 deaths
American male curlers
American curling champions